Ming is an album by David Murray released in 1980 on the Italian Black Saint label and the first to feature his Octet. It features performances by Murray, Henry Threadgill, Olu Dara, Lawrence "Butch" Morris, George E. Lewis, Anthony Davis, Wilber Morris and Steve McCall.

Reception

The Rolling Stone Jazz Record Guide said, "both Ming and Home display an excellent balance between written material and solos by a distinguished group of sidemen".

The Penguin Guide to Jazz selected this album as part of its suggested Core Collection.

The Allmusic review by Scott Yanow awarded the album 5 stars, stating, "His octet was always the perfect setting for tenor saxophonist David Murray, large enough to generate power but not as out of control as many of his big-band performances. Murray contributed all five originals (including "Ming" and "Dewey's Circle") and arrangements, and is in superior form on both tenor and bass clarinet. The "backup crew" is also quite notable: altoist Henry Threadgill, trumpeter Olu Dara, cornetist Butch Morris, trombonist George Lewis, pianist Anthony Davis, bassist Wilbur Morris, and drummer Steve McCall. These avant-garde performances (reissued on CD) are often rhythmic enough to reach a slightly larger audience than usual, and the individuality shown by each of these major players is quite impressive. Recommended.".

Track listing 
All compositions by David Murray
 "The Fast Life" – 8:54
 "The Hill" – 10:39
 "Ming" – 4:28
 "Jasvan" – 8:51
 "Dewey's Circle" – 6:36
 Recorded at Right Track Recording Studios, NYC, July 25 & 28,1980

Personnel 
 David Murray – tenor saxophone, bass clarinet
 Henry Threadgill – alto saxophone
 Olu Dara – trumpet
 Lawrence "Butch" Morris – cornet
 George E. Lewis – trombone
 Anthony Davis – piano
 Wilber Morris – bass
 Steve McCall – drums

References 

1980 albums
David Murray (saxophonist) albums
Black Saint/Soul Note albums